Gasan Digital Complex Station is on Gyeongbu Line, Seoul Metropolitan Subway Line 1 and Seoul Metropolitan Subway Line 7. Its former name is Garibong Station.

Station layout

Line 1

Line 7

References

Railway stations opened in 1974
Seoul Metropolitan Subway stations
Metro stations in Geumcheon District
Gyeongbu Line
Seoul Subway Line 1
Seoul Subway Line 7